The 1998 1. divisjon, Norway's second-tier football league, began play on 19 April 1998 and ended on 18 October 1998. The league was contested by 14 teams, and the top two teams won promotion to Tippeligaen, while the third placed played a promotion-playoff against the 12th-placed team in Tippeligaen to win promotion. The bottom four teams were relegated to the 2. divisjon.

Odd Grenland and Skeid won promotion to Tippeligaen, while Kjelsås lost the promotion-playoff against Kongsvinger. Aalesund, Strindheim, Ullern and Ham-Kam was relegated to the 2. divisjon.

League table

See also
 1998 Tippeligaen
 1998 2. divisjon
 1998 3. divisjon

References

Norwegian First Division seasons
2
Norway
Norway